The 2003 Asian Men's Softball Championship was an international softball tournament which featured eight nations which was held in Manila, Philippines.

Participants

References

Asian Men's Softball Championship
International softball competitions hosted by the Philippines
IOS games
2003 in Philippine sport